Tebogo Masire is the former deputy commander
and former commander of the Botswana Defence Force (BDF). He assumed the post on November 1, 2006, succeeding Lt. Gen. Louis Matshwenyego Fisher.

Under his command, in March 2007, the BDF began recruiting females into military service,
though Masire has emphasised that female recruits will not receive special treatment.

References 

Botswana generals
Living people
Year of birth missing (living people)